Svärtinge is a locality situated in Norrköping Municipality, Östergötland County, Sweden with 2,963 inhabitants in 2010.

Sports
The following sports clubs are located in Svärtinge:

 Svärtinge SK

References 

Populated places in Östergötland County
Populated places in Norrköping Municipality